Przybysz is a Polish surname. Notable people include:

 Daniel Przybysz (born 1988), Brazilian oncologist
 Kenneth Przybysz, American politician from Connecticut
 Natalia Przybysz (born 1983), Polish singer
 Ryszard Przybysz (1950–2002), Polish handball player

See also
 

Polish-language surnames